Oktyabrsky Airport  is an airport in the Republic of Bashkortostan in Russia.

Facilities
It has one runway designated 18/36 with a  asphalt surface.

References

External links
 

Airports built in the Soviet Union
Airports in Bashkortostan